Stephen Jones Galinoma is a Member of Parliament in the National Assembly of Tanzania, representing Kalenga. He belongs to the Chama Cha Mapinduzi (CCM) party.

Sources

Living people
Members of the National Assembly (Tanzania)
Year of birth missing (living people)
Place of birth missing (living people)